More Than Earthlings: An Astronaut's Thoughts for Christ-Centered Living (Broadman Press) is a 1983 non-fiction work by Apollo 15 astronaut James B. Irwin. The book is a series of short essays or meditations.

1983 non-fiction books
Books about Christianity
James Irwin
Books by astronauts